Alex Moore (born August 18, 1997) is a Canadian freestyle wrestler competing in the 86 kg freestyle event.

Personal life
Moore grew up with the sport of wrestling and has been involved with it from a young age. Moore attended Concordia University in Montreal.

Career

Junior
Moore first represented Canada at the 2014 Summer Youth Olympics in Nanjing, China, where he finished in 6th place in the 63 kg freestyle event. Moore followed this up with back to back gold medals at the Pan American Junior Championships in 2016 and 2017.

Senior
Moore's first senior competition came at the 2018 Commonwealth Games in the Gold Coast, Australia, where Moore finished in fifth place in the 86 event. Moore would also represent Canada at the 2019 Pan American Games in Lima, Peru, where he would finish fifth again in the 86 event.

In 2021, Moore won a wrestle-off to represent Canada at the final Olympic qualifier. In June 2022, Moore was named to Canada's 2022 Commonwealth Games team.

He competed in the 86kg event at the 2022 World Wrestling Championships held in Belgrade, Serbia.

References

External links 
 

Living people
1997 births
Sportspeople from Montreal
Canadian male sport wrestlers
Wrestlers at the 2018 Commonwealth Games
Wrestlers at the 2022 Commonwealth Games
Commonwealth Games bronze medallists for Canada
Commonwealth Games medallists in wrestling
Wrestlers at the 2019 Pan American Games
20th-century Canadian people
21st-century Canadian people
Medallists at the 2022 Commonwealth Games